The Grand Bay Formation is a geologic formation in Grenada. It preserves fossils dating back to the Middle Miocene period.

Fossil content 
 Ophiocamax ventosa
 Paragonaster(?) haldixoni
 Torqueoliva

See also 
 List of fossiliferous stratigraphic units in Grenada

References

Bibliography

Further reading 
 R. W. Portell, G. Hubbell, S. Donovan, D.A.T. Harper, and R. Pickerill. 2008. Miocene sharks in the Kendeace and Grand Bay formations of Carriacou, The Grenadines, Lesser Antilles. Caribbean Journal of Science 44(3):279-286

Geologic formations of the Caribbean
Geology of Grenada
Neogene Caribbean
Tuff formations
Sandstone formations
Open marine deposits